Jacqueline Fontaine is an American actress and singer who was mostly active in the 1950s.

Filmography
Dilemma of Two Angels (1948)
The Daltons' Women (1950) as singer
Skipalong Rosenbloom (1951) as Miss Caroline Witherspoon
The Strip (1951) as Frieda
Outlaw Women (1952) as Ellen Larabee
The Country Girl (1954) as lounge singer
Untamed Mistress (1956) as Velda
The Lieutenant Wore Skirts (1956) as buxom date
Born to Be Loved (1959) as dame
The Ladies Man (1961) as working girl
Murderers' Row (1966)
Guess Who Is Coming to Dinner (1967) as singer 
Bilitis (1977) as head mistress
Il y a longtemps que j'taime (1979)
Escalier C (1985) as customer

References

External links

Jacqueline Fontaine Profile

 
1927 births
American television actresses
People from Kenosha, Wisconsin
Actresses from Wisconsin